The 1962 Tour de Hongrie was the 18th edition of the Tour de Hongrie cycle race and was held from 30 June to 8 July 1962. The race started and finished in Budapest. The race was won by Adolf Christian.

Route

General classification

References

1962
Tour de Hongrie
Tour de Hongrie